The 1966 Dutch Grand Prix was a Formula One motor race held at Zandvoort on July 24, 1966. It was race 5 of 9 in both the 1966 World Championship of Drivers and the 1966 International Cup for Formula One Manufacturers. The race was the 16th Dutch Grand Prix since it was first held in 1948. It was held over 90 laps of the four kilometre circuit for a race distance of 382 kilometres.

The race was the third in succession to be won by Australian driver, 1959 and 1960 world champion, Jack Brabham in his Brabham BT19. Brabham lapped the field on his way to his second Dutch Grand Prix victory to add to his win in 1960. British driver, 1962 world champion Graham Hill finished second in his BRM P261, himself a lap ahead of the rest of the field. Reigning world champion Jim Clark took his first podium finish of the year in his Lotus 33, after duelling with the Brabhams in the early stages, even leading the race and pulling away before suffering a water pump failure that set him back two laps.

Brabham's win expanded his points lead to 16 points over Hill, with Hill's BRM teammate Jackie Stewart two points further away.

Classification

Qualifying

Race

Championship standings after the race

Drivers' Championship standings

Constructors' Championship standings

 Notes: Only the top five positions are included for both sets of standings.

References

Dutch Grand Prix
Dutch Grand Prix
Grand Prix
Dutch Grand Prix